École Normale Supérieure (ENSUP; alternate, National Superior School of Mali) is a public school of higher education in Bamako, Mali.

Notable alumni
 Tiébilé Dramé, Malian politician
 Alpha Oumar Konaré, President of Mali
 Moussa Konaté, Malian writer
 Assane Kouyaté, Malian film director
 Yeah Samaké, candidate in the 2012 Malian presidential election
 Téréba Togola, Malian archaeologist
 Dandara Touré, Malian politician

References

Education in Mali
Educational organisations based in Mali
Buildings and structures in Bamako